St. Louis and San Francisco Railroad Building or variations with Depot may refer to:

St. Louis and San Francisco Railroad Building (Joplin, Missouri), listed on the National Register of Historic Places (NRHP)
St. Louis-San Francisco Railroad Depot (Poplar Bluff, Missouri), NRHP-listed
St. Louis and San Francisco Railway Depot (Comanche, Texas), NRHP-listed